Club Atlético Chaco For Ever, usually just Chaco For Ever, is an Argentine Football club, their home town is Resistencia, in the Province of Chaco in Northern Argentina. They currently play in the Primera Nacional, the second tier of Argentine football.

History 

Chaco For Ever was founded in 1913. The use of an English phrase was common to clubs in Argentina at the turn of the 20th century but the term ‘Chaco For Ever’ is unique. It is thought that the club founder felt that such a name would guarantee a prosperous future and, in short, make it a club ‘forever’. The colours the club chose to wear as their identity represented the local economy at the time: white for cotton and black for coal.

The club has had two seasons at the top level (Primera División), in 1989/1990 and 1990/91. The 1989/90 season was the most successful in their history, as they finished 17th, and won the relegation playoff against Racing de Córdoba 5–0 to retain their place in the Primera División. The next season, the Primera was divided into two tournaments, the Apertura and Clausura. Chaco For Ever finished 16th and 19th, condemning them to relegation with a points per game average of only 0.789. 

The team has also played seven seasons at the 2nd level (Primera B Nacional).

The club's jersey is the same as Italy's Juventus.

See also
List of football clubs in Argentina
Argentine football league system

References

External links
  Official website

Football clubs in Chaco Province
Association football clubs established in 1913
1913 establishments in Argentina